Fabulous is a Canadian comedy-drama film, directed by Mélanie Charbonneau and released in 2019. The film centres on Laurie (Noémie O'Farrell), Clara (Juliette Gosselin) and Élisabeth (Mounia Zahzam), three young female friends who document the ups and downs of their lives on social media.

The characters originated in Les Stagiares, a web series Charbonneau created in the mid-2010s. Charbonneau cowrote the screenplay with novelist Geneviève Pettersen.

Accolades
The film won the Busan Bank Award at the 24th Busan International Film Festival.

The film received five Prix Iris nominations at the 22nd Quebec Cinema Awards, including for Best Film.

References

External links

2019 films
2019 comedy-drama films
Canadian comedy-drama films
2010s French-language films
Films set in Quebec
Films shot in Quebec
French-language Canadian films
2010s Canadian films